Scévole de Sainte-Marthe may refer to:

 Scévole de Sainte-Marthe (1536–1623), French poet
 Scévole de Sainte-Marthe (1571–1650), French historian